The Morgan Arboretum is a  forested reserve, on the McGill University Macdonald Campus in Sainte-Anne-de-Bellevue on the western tip of the Island of Montreal, Quebec, Canada.

History
McGill University acquired the property in 1945, and through the work of Robert Watson and his son, John Watson, the Arboretum has remained a managed, mixed-used area, used for the purpose of conservation, academic study, recreation, and forestry management.

Flora and Fauna
The Morgan Arboretum contains 40 native species of tree including the American Beech, Sugar Maple, Butternut, Bitternut Hickory, American Elm and Black Cherry. It is also home more than 170 species of migratory and overwintering birds, 15 species of reptiles and amphibians, and 30 species of mammals.

Management

The Morgan Arboretum is supported by both McGill University and a charity, the Morgan Arboretum Association. Annual memberships are available and there is an active member's organisation, the Friends of the Morgan Arboretum, which had 2000 members as of 2010. Visitors are welcomed and are charged an admission fee.

References

External links
Morgan Arboretum homepage

Parks in Montreal
Arboreta in Canada
Sainte-Anne-de-Bellevue, Quebec
1945 establishments in Quebec